Encore is the eighth studio album by the English ska revival band The Specials. It is their first studio album of original songs since 1998's Guilty 'til Proved Innocent!, and their first new material with vocalist Terry Hall since 1981's "Ghost Town" single.

The album features three covers of older songs; "Black Skin Blue Eyed Boys" (originally by The Equals), "Blam Blam Fever" (originally by The Valentines) and "The Lunatics" (originally by Hall and Lynval Golding's group Fun Boy Three, released in 1981 as "The Lunatics (Have Taken Over the Asylum)"). The Specials, in a different incarnation, previously released a cover of "Blam Blam Fever" on 2000's studio album Skinhead Girl.

The track "10 Commandments" is a rebuttal to Prince Buster's "Ten Commandments", criticising the original's outdated representation of women. The track features a lead vocal from Saffiyah Khan, who came to prominence after being photographed challenging an English Defence League demonstration whilst wearing a Specials t-shirt. 

Encore entered at number 1 on the UK Albums Chart after its first week of release, falling to 5 the week after and spending 9 weeks on the charts.

Track listing
All tracks written by Terry Hall, Horace Panter, Lynval Golding, and Nikolaj Torp Larsen; except where indicated.

 "Black Skin Blue Eyed Boys" (Eddy Grant) – 3:17
 "B.L.M." – 5:05
 "Vote for Me" – 5:01
 "The Lunatics" (Neville Staple, Hall, Golding) – 3:35
 "Breaking Point" – 3:56
 "Blam Blam Fever" (Earl Grant, V. E. Grant) – 2:46
 "10 Commandments" (Hall, Panter, Golding, Torp Larsen, Saffiyah Khan) – 3:53
 "Embarrassed by You" (Hall, Panter, Golding, Torp Larsen, Mark Adams) – 3:05
 "The Life and Times (Of a Man Called Depression)" – 5:27
 "We Sell Hope" – 4:34

Deluxe version

A deluxe version was released including a CD of live recordings.

 "Gangsters" (Horace Panter, Jerry Dammers, John Bradbury, Lynval Golding, Neville Staple, Rod Byers, Terry Hall) – 3:13
 "A Message to You, Rudy" (Robert Thompson) – 2:51
 "Nite Klub" (Horace Panter, Jerry Dammers, John Bradbury, Lynval Golding, Neville Staple, Rod Byers, Terry Hall) – 4:49
 "Friday Night, Saturday Morning" (Terry Hall) – 3:16
 "Stereotype" (Jerry Dammers) – 4:42
 "Redemption Song" (Bob Marley) – 3:53
 "Monkey Man" (Toots Hibbert) – 2:38
 "Too Much Too Young" (Jerry Dammers) – 2:04
 "Enjoy Yourself (It's Later Than You Think)" (Carl Sigman, Herb Magidson) – 3:33
 "Ghost Town" (Jerry Dammers) – 5:40
 "All The Time In The World" (Hal David, John Barry) – 3:25

Tracks 2-1, 2-2, 2-4, 2-5, 2-7, 2-9, 2-10 Recorded at Le Bataclan, Paris 30/11/2014

Tracks 2-3, 2-6, 2-8, 2-11 Recorded at The Troxy, London 16/11/2016
 Gary Powell – drums (London)
 John Bradbury – drums (Paris)

Stanford Quartet (Paris)
 Laura Stanford – violin
 Eleanor Stanford – violin
 Amy Stanford – viola
 Jessica Cox – cello

Personnel

The Specials
 Terry Hall – vocals
 Lynval Golding – vocals, guitar
 Horace Panter – bass guitar

With
 Nikolaj Torp Larsen – keyboards, vocals
 Steve Cradock – guitar
 Kenrick Rowe – drums
 Tim Smart – trombone, tuba
 Pablo Mendelssohn – trumpet
 Saffiyah Khan – guest vocals (10 Commandments)

String quartet
 Ian Burdge – cello
 Bruce White – viola
 Oli Langford – violin
 Tom Pigott-Smith – violin

Technical
 George Murphy – engineering
 Sophie Ellis – engineering assistance
 Cenzo Townshend – mixing
 Robert Sellens – mixing assistance
 Frank Arkwright – master engineering

Charts

Weekly charts

Year-end charts

References

The Specials albums
2019 albums
Island Records albums
Ska albums by British artists